The R101 was a British airship which crashed in 1930.

R101 may also refer to:
 R101 (Italy), a radio station
 R101 (South Africa), a road
 NOAAS Oceanographer (R 101), a US oceanographic research vessel
 R101 railway (Croatia), a railway line in Croatia

See also
 R101 road (disambiguation)